Jan Hendrik de Beer (born 22 April 1971) is a South African former rugby union player. He played flyhalf for the South African national team, the Springboks. In all he represented the Springboks in 13 tests, scoring 181 points. He was principally known as a kicking fly-half.

Career
Born in Welkom, de Beer represented  at the 1989 Craven Week tournament.

De Beer made his début against the British & Irish Lions in 1997, being brought in for the dropped Henry Honiball whose running game had been contained by the Lions' defence in the first two of the three tests. He failed however to establish himself properly in the Springbok side.

De Beer is most famous for his world record five drop goals in a single test match, set in the 1999 Rugby World Cup in Paris against England. The Springboks won the match 44-21, knocking England out of the tournament.  However, his attempts to repeat the tactic in the semi-final versus Australia backfired, as despite several attempts he only scored one in the match, and the Australians closed him down. It proved to be his final appearance for the Springboks.

A professed Christian, de Beer credits his faith in God for his successes.  De Beer retired from professional rugby in 2002 due to a knee injury.

At the end of 2019, de Beer was appointed as the director of rugby at the Windhoek Gymnasium.

Test history 

Legend: pen = penalty (3 pts.); conv = conversion (2 pts.), drop = drop kick (3 pts.).

See also
List of South Africa national rugby union players – Springbok no. 653

References

External links

Official website of the IRB Rugby World Cup 2003, accessed 17 October 2005.
“Star Q & A: Jannie de Beer”, accessed 17 October 2005.
“Rugby World Cup 1999: De Beer Diamond”, accessed 17 October 2005.

1971 births
Living people
Bulls (rugby union) players
Free State Cheetahs players
Lions (United Rugby Championship) players
Rugby union fly-halves
Rugby union players from Welkom
South Africa international rugby union players
South African rugby union players